The Sulu State College is a public college in Jolo, Sulu, Philippines.  It is mandated to provide higher technological, professional, and vocational instruction and training in science, agricultural and industrial fields, as well as short-term technical or vocational courses. It shall promote research, advance studies, and progressive leadership in its areas of specialization. It was established by the Americans in 1924 as Sulu High School and was then the highest institution of learning in Sulu. In 1963, Sulu High School was renamed Dayang Hadji Piandao Memorial High School in honor of the late Pangian (Queen) of Sulu, pursuant to Republic Act No. 3712. In 1982, Jolo Community College and the Dayang Hadji Piandao Memorial High School were merged to form what is now Sulu State College, pursuant to Batas Pambansa Blg. 208.

References

Universities and colleges in Sulu
State universities and colleges in the Philippines